Gandhara City may refer to:

Gandhara City or Kandahar, Afghanistan
Gandhara or Kandhara, Orissa
Gandhara in Tamil Nadu, Gandarvakottai (State Assembly Constituency)